Bror is a Scandinavian masculine given name which simply means 'brother'. The name has been found as early as in runestones in the form Brodhir. The name form Bror is known since the year 1536. It is also used heavily in a colloquial sense in the city of Belfast.

Bror used to be a name that was never given to the oldest son of a family. From the 19th century, the literal meaning of the name has not been as important and the name could be given to any son. Bror was a very common name in Sweden during the first decades of the 20th century. It has since been less common. It is also in fairly common use in Denmark and Norway.

Name day: 5 October  in Sweden, 9 January in Swedish speaking Finland, 20 May in Norway since 2014.

People with the name
Bror Hjorth, Swedish sculptor and painter
Bror Mellberg, Swedish football player
Bror Julius Olsson Nordfeldt, American artist
Bror Rexed, Swedish professor, neurosurgeon
Bror Stefenson, Swedish Navy admiral
Lille Bror Söderlundh, Swedish composer and singer
Göran Bror Benny Andersson, Swedish composer

Swedish masculine given names
Scandinavian masculine given names